The Medal for the Liberation of Korea, a.k.a. Korea 15.8.1945, was a medal awarded by the Democratic People's Republic of Korea.

History

The medal was established on October 15, 1948 by the Decree of the Presidium of the Supreme People's Assembly. It was awarded to the Red Army servicemen who participated in the Soviet-Japanese War, which led to the liberation of the Korean Peninsula from Japanese rule. In North Korea, the medal is known as Chosŏn 1945.8.15, which is the date of National Liberation Day of Korea.

Appearance
The medal is made of silver and has a diameter of 33 mm. On the obverse, in the middle, against the background of the sun's rays, is the image of the Liberation Monument in Pyongyang, which is surrounded by a wreath of laurel branches. At the intersection, there is a ribbon with the inscription 'Liberation'.

The reverse side is smooth, in the middle there is an inscription in two lines "Korea / 1945.8.15.". The ribbon is red, with wide blue stripes along both edges, separated from the middle by narrow white stripes. The tape is glued to a pentagonal metal shoe with a horizontal pin on the back for attaching to clothing.

Notable recipients
Marshal Rodion Malinovsky
Marshal Kirill Meretskov
Marshal Aleksandr Vasilevsky
Admiral of the Fleet Nikolai Kuznetsov
Captain 2nd Rank Viktor Leonov

See also

Flag of North Korea
Orders and medals of North Korea

References

Orders, decorations, and medals of North Korea
Awards established in 1948
Korea–Soviet Union relations